Johanna Raunio (born 5 November 1954 in Turku) is a Finnish actress and beauty pageant titleholder who was chosen Miss Finland in 1974. Ms. Raunio competed in the Miss Universe 1974 and Miss International 1974 pageants and placed second runner-up in both competitions. She works nowadays as a hostess and actress. From 2005 to 2009, she played Tanja Jääskeläinen in the Finnish soap series Salatut elämät on MTV3. She has acted also in theatre and in the TV series Tähtitehdas. Her role in both TV series was a mother whose son is killed. In Tähtitehdas her son Kimi dies from a shooting and in Salatut elämät her son Riku dies in a car accident.

References

1954 births
Finnish actresses
Living people
Miss Finland winners
Miss International 1974 delegates
Miss Universe 1974 contestants
People from Turku
Actors from Turku